Joan of Savoy  (1310 – 29 June 1344), was Duchess consort of Brittany by marriage to John III, Duke of Brittany. Joan was the claimant to the County of Savoy upon the death of her father in 1329 until 1339.

Life
Joan was born in 1310, she was the only child of Edward, Count of Savoy, and his wife, Blanche of Burgundy. 

Joan married 1329, aged nineteen, to the forty-three-year-old childless John III, Duke of Brittany; she was his third wife, John's second wife Isabella had died the previous year. 

The same year as Joan's marriage, her father died.  Being his only child she considered herself his successor. However, Savoy had never had a female ruler, leading to a dispute in the succession. Joan's uncle Aymon had the support of the nobles of Savoy for the Semi-Salic inheritance and succeeded as count.

John supported Joan's rights on Savoy. After the marriage, Joan renewed her claim on Savoy and allied herself with the Dauphin de Viennois against her uncle. By agreement settled by the French King  on 22 November 1339, she renounced her rights of succession in return for an annual income of 6000 livres.

Joan and John were married for twelve years but produced no offspring, and John died on 30 April 1341, leaving Joan a childless widow.  This led to a disputed succession in Brittany between John's half-brother of the same name and John's niece Joan.

In 1343, when her uncle Aymon died, Joan renewed her claim on the county of Savoy against her nine-year-old cousin, Amadeus VI.  In her will, she left the county to Philip, Duke of Orléans to spite her cousins.  In the end, he negotiated a similar settlement to the one of Joan, yielding the claim in exchange for 5000 livres annually.

Joan died on 29 June 1344.

Notes

References
 

|-

1310 births
1344 deaths
House of Savoy
Duchesses of Brittany
14th-century Breton people
14th-century French women